At least two ships have borne the name HDMS Holger Danske:

 
 

Royal Danish Navy ship names